Almer Stillwell "Mike" Monroney (March 2, 1902February 13, 1980) was an American politician who served as a United States senator from Oklahoma from 1951 to 1969, and previously as the United States representative for Oklahoma's 5th congressional district from 1939 until 1951. A member of the Democratic Party, Monroney was the last Democrat to hold Oklahoma’s Class 3 Senate seat.

Background

He was born on March 2, 1902, in Oklahoma City, Oklahoma (then in Oklahoma Territory). His parents, A. E. "Doc" and Daisy Stillwell Monroney, had moved to Oklahoma Territory shortly after the Land Rush of 1889. Monroney graduated from the University of Oklahoma in 1924 with a degree in journalism. His college experience was distinguished with a Phi Beta Kappa key, the Bronze Letzeiser award for scholastic standing and activities, and membership in Pe-et, the university's oldest honor society.

Career

Monroney was a reporter for the Oklahoma News from 1924 to 1928.  After hiring on with the Oklahoma News, he was assigned to report on local crime stories. Somehow, he scooped nearly every political reporter in the state by revealing that the well-respected Senator Robert L. Owen would not support former Governor John C. "Jack" Walton's bid for the Senate in 1924.

Monroney's career in journalism ended in 1928, when his father asked him to help with the family's furniture business. A few weeks later, his father died, leaving Mike as president of the company. In 1938 he ran for Congress as a Democrat and was elected, then reelected in the five next elections, until 1951. In 1932, Monroney married Mary Ellen Mellon.

House of Representatives
Monroney first ran for political office in 1937, when he entered the special election for the U.S. Fifth Congressional District against thirteen other Democrats. Although he was largely unknown, he at least came in third. He ran again in the next election (1938), and won the Democratic primary against the same number of hopefuls. He won the general election by a comfortable margin.

He was an active supporter of Presidents Roosevelt and Truman and most of their programs during his twelve years in the House of Representatives, even voting for the Taft-Wagner-Ellender Bill of 1949 that promised to build 810,000 public housing units. He was a strong supporter of foreign aid, joining the Herter Committee, which laid the foundation for the famous and highly successful Marshall Plan.

As a Representative, he co-authored the Legislative Reorganization Act of 1946. This was considered the only major reform of congress in the 20th Century. For this effort, he received the Collier's Magazine Award for Distinguished Congressional Service.  In 1947–8, he served on the Herter Committee.

Senate
In 1950, Monroney challenged incumbent Elmer Thomas for the Democratic Party nomination to the U.S. Senate. Thomas had been politically powerful since Oklahoma was granted statehood, and was expected to win his fifth term in the Senate. Monroney upset him in the primary. The Republicans had already nominated Rev. W. H. "Bill" Alexander, pastor of Oklahoma City's First Christian Church. Monroney also won the general election. He served in that position until 1969, when he lost the seat to Henry Bellmon, formerly Republican Governor of Oklahoma.

Monroney was considered as a running mate for Illinois Governor Adlai Stevenson in 1952, but was rejected for his lack of national recognition.

As a Senator, he sponsored the Automobile Information Disclosure Act of 1958. The law required that all new automobiles carry a sticker on a window containing important information about the vehicle. That sticker is commonly known as a "Monroney sticker". After the war there were many more Americans who wanted cars than there were cars and he saw that there was a need for consumer protection for the returning veterans. 

As chairman of the Aviation Subcommittee of the Senate Commerce Committee, Monroney wrote and sponsored the Federal Aviation Act of 1958 that created the Federal Aviation Administration, to improve aviation safety and achieve better coordination of air traffic in the aftermath of several deadly air crashes. All private planes in the United States are registered at the Mike Monroney Aeronautical Center in Oklahoma City. Air traffic controllers are also trained there. As a result of Monroney's contributions to aviation, he was known as "Mr. Aviation" in the Senate.

In 1958, Monroney was the supporter of a soft loan fund in the World Bank which later became the International Development Association. In 1961, he was awarded the Wright Brothers Memorial Trophy by the National Aeronautics Association and in 1964 he received the first Tony Jannus Award for his distinguished contributions to the commercial aviation industry.

Monroney seemed unafraid of political controversies. Senator Joseph McCarthy, a Republican from Wisconsin, was riding high in the Senate, and had become notorious for intimidating his opponents as enemies of the United States. Monroney and McCarthy clashed more than once in open debate. He played a part in having the Senate censure McCarthy for his extremist tactics. Monroney also risked losing his seat in 1956, when he refused to sign the Southern Manifesto that urged resistance to school desegregation. He voted for the Civil Rights Acts of 1957, 1960, 1964, and 1968, as well as the 24th Amendment to the U.S. Constitution, the Voting Rights Act of 1965, and the confirmation of Thurgood Marshall to the U.S. Supreme Court.

He was voted by the Senate pages as "the nicest Senator." He lost reelection after thirty years of Congressional service in 1968 to former Republican Governor Henry Bellmon, who benefited from the coattails of the election of Richard M. Nixon as president.

Death
He died on February 13, 1980, in Rockville, Maryland. An active Episcopalian during his life, he left a $10,000 honorarium to the Episcopal Diocese of Oklahoma for the Casady School in Oklahoma City.  After his death, half of the Senator's ashes and those of his wife were buried in Washington National Cathedral, where they had been active in the congregation. Mrs. Monroney served as a visitors guide at the cathedral every Friday afternoon for some 15 years. The other half of Senator Monroney's ashes was scattered at the Mike Monroney Aeronautical Center in Oklahoma City.

Legacy
He was married to Mary Ellen Mellon of the Mellon banking family and had one son, Michael Monroney; four grandchildren, Erin Monroney, Alice Monroney, Michael Monroney, Jr. and Susanna Monroney Quinn; and four great-grandchildren.

Notes

References

External links
Congressional biography
A. S. Mike Monroney Collection and Photograph Series at the Carl Albert Center
The Senator Behind the Window Sticker

1902 births
1980 deaths
Burials at Washington National Cathedral
Politicians from Oklahoma City
Democratic Party United States senators from Oklahoma
University of Oklahoma alumni
Democratic Party members of the United States House of Representatives from Oklahoma
20th-century American politicians
20th-century American Episcopalians